Rapiscan may refer to:

 Rapiscan, a brand for the pharmaceutical drug regadenoson
 Rapiscan Systems, a manufacturer of metal detectors